Musa Bamaiyi (11 June 1948 – 17 April 2007) was a Nigerian Army major general who headed the National Drug Law Enforcement Agency (NDLEA). He was older brother to former Chief of Army Staff, Lt-General Ishaya Bamaiyi. Musa Bamaiyi was also acting Governor of Benue State in 1984.

NDLEA Chairman
The NDLEA, under Bamaiyi's tenure arrested Fela Anikulapo Kuti for the possession of illegal drugs.  About 100 or more people (including minors) were arrested when the NDLEA raided Fela's popular shrine location. Bamaiyi noted that the NDLEA tried to rehabilitate Fela during a live television broadcast where Bamaiyi and Fela disagreed on the harmful nature of Indian Hemp. Fela Kuti filed a $1.2 million lawsuit for his "unlawful arrest and detention" by the NDLEA and reportedly has an unreleased composition titled Bamaiyi, presumably about his encounter with the NDLEA and Musa Bamaiyi.

Sibling rivalry with Ishaya Bamaiyi
Musa Bamaiyi reportedly feuded with his younger brother, Lt-General Ishaya Bamaiyi for years and sought  redress from the Human Rights Violation Investigation Commission (HRVIC) Panel, headed by Justice Chukwudifu Oputa.

Death
Musa Bamaiyi died on 17 April 2007, aged 58.

References

Nigerian Army officers
Nigerian generals
1948 births
2007 deaths